Wendy James is an English singer-songwriter.

Wendy James may also refer to:

 Wendy James (anthropologist) (born 1940), British social anthropologist and academic
 Wendy James (author) (born 1966), Australian author of crime and literary fiction